AD Singh is an Indian entrepreneur, the founder and Managing Director of the Olive Group of Restaurants.

Early years
Born in Delhi in 1960, Singh moved to Mumbai at a young age and attended Cathedral and John Connon School. Soon after college, a scholarship at Lafayette took him to Pennsylvania to earn a degree that got him into the blue-chip companies TCS and Cadbury’s on his return to India.

Singh also worked with various NGOs, and wrote a weekly food column for The Metropolis - a part of The Times Group – in the 1990s. In 1988, he set up his first F&B venture, a boat party planning service called Party Lines.

Career
Singh made his restaurant business debut in 1990 with Just Desserts, a jazz café that served only coffee and desserts. He launched Olive at Union Park, Bandra in the year 2000.

In 2003, Singh opened Olive Bar and Kitchen in New Delhi, which was announced as one of the ‘Best new restaurants in the world’ by Condé Nast Traveler. Olive won numerous awards and accolades across Mumbai, Delhi, Bengaluru, Goa, Kolkata, and Hyderabad. – where, in 2005, Singh opened Olive Beach.

Singh has launched 15 restaurant brands throughout the country. He is credited with many ‘firsts’ in the Indian restaurant scene. Apart from India's first truly standalone restaurant Olive in Mumbai, AD has also opened India's first cocktail bar serving cocktails made with Indian ingredients - Ek Bar, and Guppy - one of India’s first Japanese restaurants. India’s first gastropub - Monkey Bar, SodaBottleOpenerWala- to revive the dying legacy of a Bombay Irani café.

Charity
Singh runs a group wide initiative called ‘Kitchens Against Hunger’. Wherein Rs. 10 is added to every bill as a voluntary contribution towards alleviating hunger in children in India. Olive matches the amount to double the contribution which goes towards the cause.

Awards
Delwine Excellence Awards Hall of Fame 2019
Top Chef lifetime achievement - Restaurateur of the Year, 2016
Eazy Diner Lifetime Achievement of the Year 2019
DSSC announced AD Singh as The Power Packer in 2017
The Icon of Indian Restaurant Industry Award - Big F Awards 2018
The Lifetime Achievement award at the INCA awards 2017 
Certificate of Appreciation for exemplary contribution in the field of Food & Travel by Times Power Icons, 2018
Awarded Hall of Fame at the Food Food awards, 2018

Personal life
Singh is married to Sabina Singh who is the Design Director of Olive Group of Restaurants, with two children Zoe Tara Singh and Zen Singh residing in Mumbai.

References

Living people
1960 births